Trauner (German: habitational name for someone from Traun in Upper Austria) is a surname. Notable people with the surname include:
 Alexandre Trauner (1906–1993), Hungarian-French Jewish set designer
 Dirk Trauner (born 1967), Austrian chemist
 Gary S. Trauner (born 1958), a US businessman in Wyoming
 Gernot Trauner (born 1992), Austrian football player
 Marc Trauner (born 1969), German entertainer
 Richard Trauner (1900–1980), Austrian oral surgeon

German-language surnames
Surnames of Austrian origin
Surnames of German origin